Abdullah Sungkar (1937 – 20 October 1999) founded and led Jemaah Islamiyah, an Islamist terrorist and separatist organization.  He was of Hadhrami Arab descent.

See also
 Abu Bakar Ba'asyir

References

1937 births
1999 deaths
Jemaah Islamiyah
Hadhrami people
Indonesian people of Yemeni descent
Pirate radio personalities
Indonesian Islamists
Leaders of Islamic terror groups